Lemon Parade is the debut album of American rock band Tonic, released on July 16, 1996, by Polydor Records. The album has sold 1,300,000 copies to date and reached platinum status in the United States. Lemon Parade featured three singles. "If You Could Only See" was a hit single on the Billboard Mainstream Rock Tracks charts, reaching number one, and it also reached number 11 on the Billboard Airplay Hot 100, spending 63 weeks on the chart.

Based on the success of Lemon Parade, in March 1999, Tonic released a live EP with enhanced material entitled Live and Enhanced.

In 2016, Tonic released an all-acoustic version of Lemon Parade entitled Lemon Parade Revisited. This celebrated the album's 20th anniversary and utilized direct funding from fans.

Production
After Emerson Hart and Jeff Russo founded the band in 1993, the additions of bass guitar player Dan Rothchild and drummer Kevin Shepard solidified the band prior to signing their record deal in 1995. Producer Jack Joseph Puig worked with Tonic to produce the resulting album, Lemon Parade. While members of the band have traditionally been hesitant to discuss the meaning behind their songs, Hart did elaborate on some of the songs from this album. For instance, on the title track "Lemon Parade", Hart explained the song came from a dream he had.
"I had a dream about this girl. I was riding this big Schwinn Sting Ray, and I rode by her working in a lemonade stand. She looked ugly and sad because kids were throwing lemons at her. Then later on, I saw her after high school and was crazy about her. They couldn't see how beautiful she really was."

Promotion and release
Four unique music videos were produced as part of the album's promotion, including two different versions of "Open Up Your Eyes", one of which was directed by Tonic and Niels Alpert that featured the band on roller skates and a cameo appearance by Mick Fleetwood. In terms of singles from the record, "If You Could Only See" reached number one on the Billboard Mainstream Rock Tracks, and also reached number 11 on the Billboard Airplay Hot 100, where it spent 63 weeks on the chart. Lemon Parade reached number 28 on the Billboard 200, number 12 in Australia, and number 34 on the Canadian Albums Chart. In the ensuing years the popularity of "If You Could Only See" continued with its part in the video games Karaoke Revolution Party and Band Hero.

Reception

Critical response to Lemon Parade was mixed. Music critic Shawn M. Haney rated the album two and a half out of five stars, saying, "The record as a whole is full of the heavy, distortion-laden Tonic sound, and guitars that make them who they are. Although the recordings are murky at times, like shoes splashing through muddy puddles of water, the record's highlights -- such as the uplifting acoustic track 'Mountain' and the rawness of 'Wicked Soldier'—are still full of rich musical creativity."

Track listing
All songs by Emerson Hart except where noted. 
 "Open up Your Eyes" − 3:40
 "Casual Affair" (Tonic) − 3:43   
 "If You Could Only See" − 4:21
 "Soldier's Daughter" − 5:03
 "Lemon Parade" (Hart, Jeff Russo) − 3:42   
 "Mountain" − 4:38
 "Thick" − 4:21
 "Wicked Soldier" (Tonic) − 4:31   
 "Mr. Golden Deal" − 4:55
 "Bigot Sunshine" − 2:53
 "Celtic Aggression" (Hart, Dan Rothchild, Russo) − 3:26   
 "My Old Man" − 5:52

Personnel

Tonic
 Emerson Hart: Vocals, guitar, slide, percussion
 Jeff Russo: Lead and rhythm guitar, backing vocals, slide, percussion, drums on "My Old Man"
 Dan Rothchild: Bass guitar, backing vocals, slide
 Kevin Shepard: Drums

Additional personnel
 Lenny Castro: Percussion on "My Old Man", "If You Could Only See", "Mr. Golden Deal", "Celtic Aggression", "Soldier's Daughter", "Casual Affair"

Production
 Jack Joseph Puig: Producer
 Bob Ludwig: Mastering
 Jeri Heiden: Art direction
 Jean Kirkorian: Art design

Charts

Weekly charts

Year-end charts

Certifications

References

1996 debut albums
Polydor Records albums
Tonic (band) albums